A list of animated television series first aired in 1977.

See also
 List of animated feature films of 1977
 List of Japanese animation television series of 1977

References

Television series
Animated series
1977
1977
1977-related lists